Michelle Haber  (born 18 October 1956) is an Australian cancer researcher.

Haber is an Australian scientist in the field of childhood cancer research. She serves as the Executive Director of Children's Cancer Institute and is a professor at the School of Women’s and Children’s Health, University of New South Wales. She is known for her discoveries in the area of chemotherapy resistance in neuroblastoma and for translating these discoveries into new therapeutics that are currently in clinical trials.

Education
Haber attended Mount Scopus Memorial College in Melbourne and, when her family moved to Sydney, attended Moriah College, graduating in 1973. She completed a clinical psychology degree at University of New South Wales and was awarded a University Medal. She obtained her PhD from the School of Pathology at the University of New South Wales in 1984 - her thesis was entitled Structural analysis by BD-cellulose chromatography of mammalian DNA during repair, replication and degradation. She was awarded a Doctor of Science honoris causa by the University of New South Wales in 2008.

Career
In 1982, during her PhD studies, Haber spent three months as Visiting Research Fellow at the Department of Molecular Virology in Hadassah Medical Centre, Hebrew University of Jerusalem. Her first postdoctoral position was as at Children’s Leukaemia and Cancer Research Unit, a precursor to Children's Cancer Institute then located at the Prince of Wales Children’s Hospital, Randwick. Having joined as a Staff Scientist in 1984, she was promoted to Senior Research Fellow in 1992, Principal Research Fellow in 1996, Director in 2000 and Executive Director in 2003. Haber also holds a conjoint appointment as Professor in the Faculty of Medicine at the University of New South Wales.

Under her leadership Children's Cancer Institute, now located in the UNSW Lowy Cancer Research Centre, has tripled in size and grown from a little known group to become the largest children’s cancer research facility in the region.

Research
Haber’s early studies were amongst the first characterizing the complex molecular mechanisms underlying therapy-related drug resistance.  With her collaborators, she identified the relationship between high expression of multidrug transporter gene MRP1, and the malignant phenotype of neuroblastoma and poor clinical outcome. These studies provided the first definitive demonstration of clinical relevance of the MRP1 gene in solid tumours, resulting in a large international clinical study which confirmed the independent prognostic significance of MRP1 expression in neuroblastoma and established MRP1 inhibition as a potential new treatment for this disease.

By high-throughput chemical screening of small molecule libraries, Haber and her colleagues have also developed novel MRP1 inhibitors and patented and licensed the compounds for the treatment of neuroblastoma and other MRP1-associated malignancies. This led to a $3.1M award from the Australian Cancer Research Foundation to establish a Drug Discovery Centre for Childhood Cancer in the UNSW Lowy Cancer Research Centre, which is currently developing a pipeline of potential new drugs for treating childhood and adult malignancies.

Haber and her collaborators have also identified the role of ATP-binding cassette transporter genes (ABC transporters) in neuroblastoma biology, demonstrating that their expression predicts for poor clinical outcome in neuroblastoma but, unexpectedly, this phenomenon was not due to the ABC proteins’ role in drug transport, but through an independent pathway that influences fundamental aspects of tumour biology. A further study on ovarian cancer and ABCA1 has extended the discovery to common adult cancers.

Service to the scientific community
Haber is a long-term member of the International Neuroblastoma Risk Group Committee, which makes recommendations regarding standardised protocols and best practice for identifying/utilising prognostic indicators for neuroblastoma treatment risk assessment. From 2006 to 2014, Haber has served on the steering committee of the Advances in Neuroblastoma Research Association (ANRA), the peak international body for neuroblastoma research and was President of this organisation from 2010 to 2012. In 2011, Haber also played a key role in establishment of the Kids Cancer Alliance and currently serves on this organization's executive management committee. Haber is convenor of the 2016 Advances in Neuroblastoma Research conference (Cairns, Australia), one of the largest specialist childhood cancer conferences internationally.

Awards and honours
In 2007 Haber was appointed a Member of the Order of Australia (AM) for service to science in the field of childhood cancer, to scientific education, and to the community and she was also named as one of Australia’s 25 ‘True Leaders’ by Financial Review’s Boss Magazine. In 2008, Haber was awarded DSc (Honoris Causa) by University of New South Wales for eminent service to the cancer research community. She has received numerous awards for research excellence, including the NSW Science & Engineering Award for Biomedical Sciences (2011), and in that same year was a New South Wales finalist for Australian of the Year. In 2012, Haber (with her long-time collaborators Norris and Marshall) received the Cancer Institute NSW Premier’s Award for Excellence in Translational Cancer Research and was also highlighted with a National Health and Medical Research Council  (NHMRC) Ten of the Best Award. In 2013, she was showcased, again with Norris and Marshall, in an article in the Lancet. In 2013 she was a finalist in the 2013 Australian Museum Eureka Prize for Medical Research Translation, and in 2014 received the NSW Premier's Award for Outstanding Cancer Researcher of the Year. Haber was elected a Fellow of the newly formed Australian Academy of Health and Medical Sciences in March 2015 and elected Fellow of the Australian Academy of Science in 2022.

References

1956 births
Living people
Australian oncologists
Women oncologists
Jewish women scientists
Australian Jews
University of New South Wales alumni
Academic staff of the University of New South Wales
People from Liverpool
People educated at Moriah College
Members of the Order of Australia
Fellows of the Australian Academy of Science
Fellows of the Australian Academy of Health and Medical Sciences
British emigrants to Australia